Cleptometopus assamanus is a species of beetle in the family Cerambycidae. It was described by Breuning in 1967.

References

assamanus
Beetles described in 1967